Mehrenjan-e Otrak (also Romanized as Mehrenjān-e Otrak; also known as Mehranjān and Mīrājān) is a village in Oshtorjan Rural District, in the Central District of Falavarjan County, Isfahan Province, Iran. At the 2006 census, its population was 1,640, in 400 families.

References 

Populated places in Falavarjan County